Julia B Olayanju is a  geneticist, writer, and a nutrition education advocate. She adopts different approaches to increase public awareness on the science of food and health. She is the founder at FoodNiche Inc. and GrubEasy Interactive Labs Inc.

Education 
Olayanju developed an interest in scientific research while working on a research project for her master's degree at West Texas A & M University. She later proceeded to Rutgers University, New Brunswick, New Jersey where she earned her Ph.D. in Microbiology and Molecular Genetics. Her doctoral research work focused on understanding the anti-cancer properties and mechanism of action of isothiocyanates in breast cancer cells

Work 
Olayanju is the convener of the FoodNiche Tech Summit & The FoodNiche Global Innovation Summit creating networking and learning opportunities for food industry stakeholders. The conferences bring together experts from academia with business leaders from the food industry  for collaboration and thought-provoking conversations on shaping a healthier food system.

Olayanju co-founded GrubEasy Interactive Labs Inc. to leverage technology to promote science of food and health education. Through the technology platform FoodNiche®-Ed, teachers can engage, reward and educate students on the science of food and health.

Olayanju leverages the media to  communicate scientific facts and promote awareness on the importance of food to overall well-being. She started this through her column on Forbes  and more recently by hosting scientists and  food industry experts from around the world on The Food + Health Podcast

Personal life 
Julia B. Olayanju married Bunmi Olayanju in 2006, they have 2 children.

References 

American biologists
American geneticists
American women biologists
Women food scientists
American women geneticists
American food company founders
American people of Nigerian descent
21st-century American businesswomen
21st-century American businesspeople
Living people
Year of birth missing (living people)